Samaya Clark-Gabriel (born October 1, 2009) is an American child athlete and actress from the Brooklyn, New York area. She was recognized for her athletic abilities at age four.

Early life 
In 2016, Gabriel was named "Athlete of the Year" for leading the Brooklyn Stars soccer team to their first championship. In addition to receiving several tournament titles, she was presented with the Lion's Heart Award for demonstrating  drive and skill against many all-boys teams. Since then, she has taken a break from soccer to focus her efforts on basketball.

Media appearances 

Showcasing her basketball skills, Samaya has been featured on Good Morning America, GoodDay NY, CBS Sports, USA Today, News 12 Brooklyn, SportsCenter, ESPN, ESPNW, Chasing News, BRICTV, the New York Post, Fox5NY, Women You Should Know,  The Ben & Pickler Show, Harry, Rolling Stone, and People.com.

In addition to media features, Samaya has practiced with the New York Liberty Basketball team and has played 1-on-1 with NBA legend and NY Liberty President Isiah Thomas. In January 2018, Samaya became the first child to play alongside The Harlem Globetrotters in a games at Barclays Center, Madison Square Garden, and Nassau Coliseum. Gabriel and her father were featured on Fatherly social media platforms, where she garnered 2.8 million views and 76,000 shares. Recently, Samaya has been on the radar of the Olympics, as she was featured in a Monday Motivation post.

For the 2018 NBA Draft, Samaya teamed up with Verizon and Vince Carter's Dunk Clinic.

In 2020, Samaya was featured on Little Big Shots starring Melissa McCarthy.

Acting Debut 

In 2018, Samaya made her acting debut in the indie film titled Froster Sin. The film brings awareness to the mistreatment of children in the foster system.

Philanthropy 

Samaya raises donations for St. Jude Children's Research Hospital, supporting research towards cures for child cancer and other life-threatening diseases. She was recognized for her efforts by New York Governor Andrew Cuomo. Samaya also visits child life centers in Children's Hospitals around the New York area.

References

External links
 

2009 births
Living people
Actresses from New York City
Sportspeople from Brooklyn
21st-century American actresses
African-American child actresses
21st-century African-American people
21st-century African-American women